Shamsiddin Vokhidov is an Uzbekistani chess player who holds the title of Grandmaster, which he was awarded in 2020.

Vokhidov won the U14 World Youth Chess Championship in 2015.

At the age of 16, Vokhidov defeated world champion Magnus Carlsen at the 2018 World Rapid Chess Championship.

Vokhidov won the Asian Hybrid Championship in May 2021, qualifying for the Chess World Cup 2021.

References

External links

Shamsiddin Vokhidov chess games at 365Chess.com

Living people
Chess grandmasters
Uzbekistani chess players
2002 births